ASIS International, headquartered in Alexandria, Virginia, is a professional organization for security professionals. It issues  certifications, standards, and guidelines for the security profession.

Founded in 1955 as the American Society for Industrial Security (ASIS), the organization officially changed its name in 2002 to ASIS International to reflect its international expansion, which includes 37,000 members and 200 local chapters worldwide at that time. The name "American Society for Industrial Security" no longer exists except in historical legal documents.

As of 2018, educational and networking events hosted by ASIS are referred to as the "Global Security Exchange (GSX).

Certification programs 
ASIS administers four professional certification programs - "Certified Protection Professional" (CPP), "Professional Certified Investigator" (PCI),  "Physical Security Professional" (PSP) and the "Associate Protection Professional" (APP) designation.

References

External links
 Official website of ASIS International

Security organizations
International professional associations
Organizations established in 1955
Professional associations based in the United States
Physical security
1955 establishments in Virginia
Organizations based in Alexandria, Virginia